CCGS Sambro is a Canadian Coast Guard motor lifeboat homeported in Sambro, Nova Scotia.

She is a Canadian Coast Guard Arun-class lifeboat, based on the United Kingdom   design. and forms the nucleus of Canadian Coast Guard Station Sambro (CCG Station Sambro) which maintains a crew of four personnel on duty 24 hours per day (two shifts) who are expected to be underway within 30 minutes of being tasked on a search and rescue (SAR) mission by Joint Rescue Coordination Centre Halifax.

MV Kitano rescue
On March 21, 2001, CCGS Sambro,  and the commercial oceangoing salvage tug  tried to render assistance to the container ship  which had caught fire off Chebucto Head, Nova Scotia.
Kitanos cargo had caught fire when the vessel was in Force 8 to 10 winds. None of the vessels were able to render assistance.

Swissair Flight 111 response
CCGS Sambro was the first SAR asset to respond to reports of a commercial airliner crash at the mouth of St. Margaret's Bay on the evening of September 2, 1998.  There were no survivors among the 229 people on board Swissair Flight 111 and CCGS Sambro returned to normal SAR standby after other CCG and Canadian Forces assets took over search and recovery operations.

Rescued the crew of Fireboat 08-448B

On September 17, 2008,  capsized in Halifax harbour, while undergoing her acceptance trials and crew familiarization.
Sambro rescued all eight occupants, without serious injury.

See also
  - one of two lifeboat operating out of Westport, Nova Scotia.
  - same class of boat operating out of Port Hardy, British Columbia.

References

Arun-class lifeboats of the Canadian Coast Guard
Ships built in Ontario
1996 ships
Ships of the Canadian Coast Guard